Heathy Close Lock is a canal lock on the Kennet and Avon Canal, at Wootton Rivers, Wiltshire, England.

The lock has a rise/fall of 8 ft 1 in (2.46 m).

References

See also

Locks on the Kennet and Avon Canal

Locks on the Kennet and Avon Canal
Canals in Wiltshire